United We Stand (Chinese: 飛躍羚羊; Pinyin: fēi yuè líng yáng) is a 1986 Hong Kong teen motivational film directed by Kent Cheng, it stars Olivia Cheng, Fennie Yuen, Gigi Lai and Bonnie Law.The film ran in theaters from 10 October 1986 to 16 October 1986.

Plot 
Sports in Hong Kong is declining, pressures of an international track and field competition is almost too much for ten young athletes to bear, famous athlete Chi Cheng (Chi Cheng (athlete)) hires trainer Cheung (Olivia Cheng), who leg was hurt badly due to an unfortunate incident, to help them as they train for the competition. Polly (Gigi Lai) and Lam (Fennie Yuen) are rivals on the same team, they challenged trainer Cheung to a race, they realize trainer Cheung outpaced them a lot, which made them respect trainer Cheung a lot more. During their training, they entered a small competition and got great results, because of this, they became careless and lost to the Singapore national track and field team in the final. Trainer Cheung was furious and almost quit her job because of this. After this competition, they realize the important of unity and hard work. Their hard work paid off in the end as they won the international track and field competition, giving sports in Hong Kong some hope.

Cast 
 Olivia Cheng as Trainer Cheng - Hard working, has a broken leg
 Fennie Yuen as Lam Kit (林傑) - Hates his family, hurt her own leg during the international competition
 Gigi Lai as Polly Ho (何寶兒) - Has a rich but unhappy life
 Bonnie Law as Ginger Lee (李明珠) - Emotional, energetic 
 Lam Wing-Han as Bella - Leaves the training camp before the international competition
 Chiao Chiao as Polly's mother - Have high expectations for her daughter, forces her to succeed
 Kent Cheng as Canteen Boss - Grumpy, greedy
 Wellington Fung as Polly's father
 Chui Wai-Yee as Athletic trainee 
 Lee Git-Liu as Athletic trainee
 Miu Hung as Athletic trainee
 Chung Pui-Pui as Athletic trainee
 Leung Sam-Yee as Meryle Ma ''Monkey''
 Wong Chi-Ling as Cybel Mak ''Sleepy''
 Fofo Seung-Ngok Ma as Fatty
 Ken Boyle as Athletic Official
 Ka-Kui Wong as Athletic Official
 Ann Bridgewater as Ann Bridgewater (cameo)
 Charine Chan as Chan Siu Ling (cameo)
 Billy Lau as Billy (cameo)
 Stephen Chang Gwong-Chin as Tsang Kwong Chin (cameo)
 Fofo Seung-Ngok Ma as Fatty (Cameo)

Critical response 
On IMDb, it received an average rating of 6.8 out of 10 based on 17 reviews.

On the Chinese movie review website, Douban, it received an average rating of 7.1 out of 10 based on 378 user reviews.

References

External links 

United We Stand at Hong Kong Cinemagic

Cantonese-language films
Hong Kong drama films